This article lists those who were potential candidates for the Democratic nomination for Vice President of the United States in the 1984 election. Former Vice President Walter Mondale won the 1984 Democratic nomination for President of the United States, and chose New York Representative Geraldine Ferraro as his running mate. Ferraro was the first woman to be a part of a national ticket for a major party. Mondale chose Ferraro in hopes of energizing the base and winning the votes of women, but also because he viewed her as a solid legislator who had won the approval of Speaker Tip O'Neill. John R. Reilly, an attorney and a senior adviser to Mondale, managed the search for a running mate. Mondale seriously considered his major rival for the 1984 presidential nomination, Senator Gary Hart, but Mondale refused to consider a second rival, Jesse Jackson, on the grounds that the differences between their policies were too great. The Mondale–Ferraro ticket ultimately lost to the Reagan–Bush ticket. This is the last time the Democratic vice presidential nominee was not the incumbent vice president or a Senator, and, not counting the times when the incumbent President (and by extension, the incumbent vice president) was running for re-election, the last time the Democratic vice presidential nominee was not a Senator.

Selection

Finalists

Media speculation on possible vice presidential candidates 
Members of CongressGovernorsOther Individuals

See also
Walter Mondale 1984 presidential campaign
1984 Democratic Party presidential primaries
1984 Democratic National Convention
1984 United States presidential election
List of United States major party presidential tickets

References

Vice presidency of the United States
1984 in women's history
1984 United States presidential election